The Drug Elimination Museum is a museum in Yangon, Myanmar. It opened with ceremony on June 26, 2001. It is located at the corner of Kyandaw Road and Hanthawady Road in Kamayut Township, Yangon, Burma, on the former site of the city's largest cemetery, Kyandaw Cemetery. It is dedicated to the International Day Against Drug Abuse and illicit trafficking.

The museum has three floors which contain exhibits on drug abuse and government efforts to contain the problem. The highlights of the museum include the eccentric dioramas, the random exhibits that demand interpretation, and the macabre displays depicting the detrimental repercussions of drug usage.

References

Museums established in 2001
Drugs in Myanmar
Museums in Yangon
2001 establishments in Myanmar